Marty Panzer  (March 20, 1945) is an American songwriter and first song-writing partner of Barry Manilow. He is the author of over 30 songs recorded by Manilow and over a hundred songs for Disney Pictures. He also co-wrote the song "Through The Years", performed by Kenny Rogers.

His song-writing contributed to 35 gold and platinum albums. He is a recipient of the  1999 Annie Award for Music in a Feature Production. He also wrote songs to Disney's Pocahontas II: Journey to a New World and The Lion King II: Simba's Pride.

Personal life
Panzer originates from  Brooklyn, New York City, having been born and raised just blocks away from Manilow. They first met while working together in the CBS-TV mailroom in New York.

See also
:Category:Songs with lyrics by Marty Panzer

References

Year of birth missing (living people)
Living people
Songwriters from New York (state)
Musicians from Brooklyn